Koolkerke is small district of Bruges in the province of West Flanders in Belgium.

Although Roman remains have been found, the first written mention of the village Koolkerke dates from the 12th century. The name "Coolkercke" was first mentioned in 1243. The Old Zwin, a watercourse which connected Bruges to the Zwin in Knokke and the Nortsea, ran past the village. Old Zwin silted up, replaced by a canal constructed by the order of Napoleon and two forts were built in the 17th century: Fort Lapin south of Koolkerke and the 'Fort de Bavière' or Fort van Beieren, the remains of this can be seen today.

It is believed that the name derives from Kool, a short version of the name Nicolas, hence from the church of St Nicholas. The church in Koolkerke was named by the settlement's founder, Nicolaas Gaillaerd.

Other local attractions include the old windmill Ter Panne, and the Groene Poort castle, Dudzeelse steenweg 460 (now called Château Rougesse).

References

External links
 Web.archive.org

Sub-municipalities of Bruges
Populated places in West Flanders